The steam locomotives of DR Class 23.10, (from 1 June 1970 Class 35.10) were passenger train engines built for the Deutsche Reichsbahn in East Germany after the Second World War.Is produced in H0 scale to many train model railway.

History 

The Class 23.10 was an evolutionary development by the DR of the DRG Class 23 standard locomotives or Einheitsdampflokomotiven built earlier by the Deutsche Reichsbahn-Gesellschaft. Only two of the latter were completed due to the onset of the war. The same dimensions were used for the driving and running gear, but the locomotives were given IfS/DR mixer-preheaters, boilers equipped with combustion chambers and a large driver's cab. The feedwater dome was omitted from locomotives numbered 23 1003 and later. The first of 113 units was deployed in 1955, and they were used for light to medium express train services, being allocated numbers 23 1001–1113.

With the introduction of EDP numbering on 1 January 1970, all locomotives were re-numbered to 35 1001–1113.

The last engines were retired from Nossen in May 1977, number 35 1113 however had to be reactivated due to the energy crisis and continued in service until 1985.

The locomotives were equipped with tenders of Class 2'2' T 28.

Preserved locomotives
Remaining locomotives of this class today include:
 35 1019  Lausitzer Dampflokclub Cottbus, operational
 35 1021  Eisenbahn & Technik Museum Rügen, Prora
 35 1028  in pieces, Röbel/Müritz
 35 1074  in pieces, Görlitz
 35 1097  private, at IG 58 3047 Glauchau, operational
 35 1113  DB Museum, stored at  IG Dampflok Nossen

See also 
 List of East German Deutsche Reichsbahn locomotives and railbuses
 Neubaulok
 DB Class 23

Literature
 
 

23.10
23.10
Railway locomotives introduced in 1955
23.10
Passenger locomotives
Standard gauge locomotives of Germany
1′C1′ h2 locomotives
LKM locomotives